Kim Woo-seok (born 4 August 1996) is a South Korean football defender who plays for Gangwon FC and the South Korea national under-20 football team.

Club career
Born on 4 August 1996, Kim joined Daegu FC in 2016, and made his debut for the club on 28 May 2017, playing against Sangju Sangmu.

Club career statistics

Honors and awards

Player
Daegu FC
 Korean FA Cup Winners (1) : 2018

References

External links 
 

1996 births
Living people
Association football defenders
South Korean footballers
Daegu FC players
K League 1 players
Sportspeople from Ulsan
21st-century South Korean people